Brownsboro High School is a public high school located in the city of Brownsboro, Texas, United States and is classified as a 4A school by the UIL.  It is a part of the Brownsboro Independent School District located in northeastern Henderson County.   In 2021, the school was rated "Exceptional" by the Texas Education Agency.

Athletics
The Brownsboro Bears compete in these sports - 

Volleyball, Cross Country, Football, Basketball, Powerlifting, Swimming, Golf, Tennis, Track, Baseball, Soccer & Softball

State Titles
Boys Basketball  
1967(1A)
Girls Basketball
2022(4A)

State Finalists
Boys Basketball  
1958(1A), 1961(1A), 1985(3A), 1986(3A), 1996(4A.
Rival Schools

▪︎Van Vandals

▪︎Athens Hornets 

▪︎Canton Eagles

References

External links
Brownsboro ISD website

Public high schools in Texas
Schools in Henderson County, Texas